The Brumby Rocker is a rocking chair built by the Brumby Chair Factory of the Brumby Chair Company in Marietta, Georgia, which operated between 1875 and 1942, or by its successor which started in 1972. Jimmy Carter brought five Brumby rockers to the White House.

The chair is deliberately large, with large arms, seat and "runners" and a very high back.

History
James Remley Brumby was the first owner of the Brumby Chair Factory.

The successor company started manufacturing in 1972.

Buildings
The Brumby Chair Factory building (c. 1879), on Church Street in Marietta, is a contributing building in the Northwest Marietta Historic District. The Brumby-Sibley-Corley House, at 285 Kennesaw Avenue in the district, is a mid-Victorian house built by James Remley Brumby (photo #1).

Notes

References

External links
The Brumby Chair Co., official site

Chairs
Furniture
Furniture companies of the United States